Anthony J. Mercorella (March 6, 1927 – February 3, 2022) was an American politician who served in the New York State Assembly from 1966 to 1972 and in the New York City Council from 1973 to 1975. Mercorella was born in New York City, New York in The Bronx. He graduated from Long Island University and Fordham University School of Law. He practiced law in New York City. Mercorella served as a civil court judge and then served on the New York Supreme Court. Mercorella died on February 3, 2022, in Naples, Florida, at the age of 94.

References

1927 births
2022 deaths
Democratic Party members of the New York State Assembly
New York City Council members
New York Supreme Court Justices
Politicians from the Bronx
Lawyers from New York City
Long Island University alumni
Fordham University School of Law alumni